Regbio klubas Vairas (also known as Vairas-Jupoja for sponsorship reasons) is a Lithuanian amateur rugby club based in the city of Šiauliai.

Honours
 Lithuanian Rugby Championships 
 1982, 1983, 1984, 1986, 1987, 1988, 1989, 1992, 1994, 1995, 1997, 1998, 1999, 2000, 2001, 2002, 2003, 2005, 2007, 2008, 2009, 2010, 2011, 2012, 2013
 Lithuanian Rugby Sevens
 1994, 1995, 1996, 1997, 1998, 1999, 2000, 2003, 2007, 2008, 2009, 2010, 2013

External links
 Official website

Lithuanian rugby union teams
Sport in Šiauliai